Mohammad-Hossein Shaker is an Iranian retired military officer who served as the Chief-of-Staff of the Islamic Republic of Iran Army from July 1979 until September 1979.

References

Living people
Islamic Republic of Iran Army major generals
Non-U.S. alumni of the Command and General Staff College
Year of birth missing (living people)